Joel Segal is an American sports agent and Managing Director Team Sports and Co-Head WME Football, and was formerly President Americas of SPORTFIVE. He graduated Magna Cum Laude from George Washington University, where he was inducted into the George Washington University Sports Executives Hall of Fame in 2011. Segal graduated from Hofstra Law School and is a member of the Hofstra Law School Hall of Fame.

Segal has been named to USA Today's "The NFL's 100 Most Important People" list,  Forbes "World's Most Powerful Sports Agents" list, and named one of the "Most Powerful Sports Agents" by Sports Business Journal.

Career

Segal has negotiated billions of dollars in NFL contracts for a formidable list of players, recently negotiating record setting deals for Khalil Mack of the Chicago Bears and Christian McCaffrey of the San Francisco 49ers, while also representing multiple first round draft picks for 14 consecutive years..

With over 25 years of experience representing NFL players, Segal has built one of the largest practices in the league. His list of clients includes many first-round draft picks, pro bowlers, and other notable players.

References 

Living people
American sports agents
George Washington University alumni
Maurice A. Deane School of Law alumni
Year of birth missing (living people)